Aliabad (also Romanized as ‘Alīābād) is a village in Shohada Rural District, Yaneh Sar District, Behshahr County, Mazandaran Province, Iran. At the 2006 census, its population was 22, in 6 families.

References 

Populated places in Behshahr County